The Comorian records in swimming are the fastest ever performances of swimmers from the Comoros, which are recognised and ratified by the Comoros Swimming Federation.

All records were set in finals unless noted otherwise.

Long Course (50 m)

Men

Women

Short Course (25 m)

Men

Women

References

Comoros
Records
Swimming